The women's 4 × 400 metres relay competition of the athletics events at the 1979 Pan American Games took place on 14 July at the Estadio Sixto Escobar. The defending Pan American Games champion was the Canadian team.

Records
Prior to this competition, the existing world and Pan American Games records were as follows:

Results
All times shown are in minutes and seconds.

Final

References

Athletics at the 1979 Pan American Games
1979